Daniel B. Luten also known as Daniel Benjamin Luten (Dec. 26, 1869-July 3, 1946) was an American bridge builder and engineer based in Indianapolis, Indiana.

Career
He designed and patented the Luten arch, a type of concrete arch bridge.  He obtained more than 30 patents eventually, including various refinements of design that used transverse and other reinforcement which allowed bridges to be lighter.
"By 1919, Luten claimed to have designed some 17,000 arches, and stated that examples of his designs could be found in all but three states of the Union. Indiana alone had some 2,000 Luten arches."
He was born in Grand Rapids, Michigan in 1869.

He graduated from the University of Michigan in 1894, in civil engineering. He was an instructor, in architectural and sanitary engineering, for Purdue University from 1895 to 1900.  He resigned in 1900 to conduct the bridge company work.

List of Bridges
A number of historic bridges, some of which are listed on the U.S. National Register of Historic Places are credited to him, including (with specific attribution):
Beck's Mill Bridge, Carries Beck's Mill Road over Mill Creek, Salem, IN (Luten, Daniel B.), NRHP-listed
Canyon Padre Bridge, Abandoned grade of US 66 over Padre Canyon, Flagstaff, AZ. (Luten, Daniel B.), NRHP-listed
Carrollton Bridge, Carrollton Rd. across Wabash R., Delphi, IN (Luten, Daniel B.), NRHP-listed
Dr. George S. Smith Memorial Bridge, 3rd St. across Lehigh R., Easton, PA. (Luten, Daniel B.)
Dumbarton Bridge (Washington, D.C.), Q Street across Rock Creek Park, Washington, D.C.
Holbrook Bridge, Abandoned grade of US 70 over the Little Colorado River, 4.2 mi. SE of Holbrook, AZ. (Luten, Daniel B.), NRHP-listed
Kelvin Bridge, Florence-Kelvin Hwy. over the Gila River, Kelvin, AZ. (Luten, Daniel), NRHP-listed
Putnam County Bridge No. 159, Co. Rd. 650 W. over Big Walnut Cr., Reelsville, IN. (Luten, Daniel B.), NRHP-listed
 Moores Creek Bridge, Fort Pierce, Florida
Winkelman Bridge, Old AZ 77 over the Gila River, Winkelman, AZ. (Luten, Daniel), NRHP-listed
Wolcott Bridge, CO 131 at milepost 0.07, Wolcott, CO.(Luten, Daniel B.), NRHP-listed
Miami Bridges, Miami, Arizona five identical bridges across the town Bloody Tanks wash canal, 1921, Luten, Daniel, NRHP-listed

Additional Luten arch bridges are NRHP-listed that are attributed to the Luten Bridge Company or to Topeka Bridge & Iron Co., two firms which had use of Luten's patented designs.

References

External links
 
 Daniel B. Luten papers, Rare Books and Manuscripts, Indiana State Library

American civil engineers
People from Grand Rapids, Michigan
University of Michigan College of Engineering alumni
Purdue University faculty
People from Indianapolis
 
1869 births
1946 deaths